Darreh Khoshk-e Hatemvand (also Romanized as Darreh Khoshk-e Ḩātemvand; also known as Darreh Khoshk) is a village in Ahmadfedaleh Rural District, Sardasht District, Dezful County, Khuzestan Province, Iran. At the 2006 census, its population was 13, in 4 families.

References 

Populated places in Dezful County